Glare may refer to:

 Glare (vision), difficulty seeing in the presence of very bright light
 Glaring, a facial expression of squinted eyes and look of contempt
 A call collision in telecommunications
 GLARE, Glass reinforced aluminium, an advanced aerospace material
 Gloor, family name from Aargau, Switzerland, also written as Glares, Glarer, Glaren, Glar, or Glaar

Music
 Glare (album), a 2001 album by Leo O'Kelly
 The Glare, 2009 album by British musicians Michael Nyman with David McAlmont
 "Glare", 2000 song by Japanese band Edge of Spirit
 "Glare", 2013 song by Japanese band Defspiral

See also
 Glair
 Glarus